Rovers North Inc is a privately held Land Rover parts dealer located in Westford, Vermont, United States. The company supports all original Land Rover models specializing in the Defender, Series II and III. They offer the entire range of Land Rover Genuine Parts direct from Land Rover UK, as well as publish North America's largest Land Rover publication, Rovers Magazine.

Owners Mark and Andrea Letorney founded the company in 1979.

Rovers North has been a direct distributor of Land Rover Genuine Parts since 1985. Rovers North offers its ProLine parts alongside the genuine parts. Sourced from a variety of manufacturers, ProLine is an alternative when a Genuine Part is no longer available or a lower cost replacement is preferred.

Rovers North was featured in the May 1994 Car and Driver article titled "Eight Miles, Seven Hours".

References

External links 
 Rovers North website
 Rovers Magazine
 Land Rover Lifestyle Article
 Business People's Magazine Article

1979 establishments in Vermont
Automotive part retailers of the United States
Companies based in Vermont
American companies established in 1979
Retail companies established in 1979